Portes (Greek: Πόρτες meaning doors) is a village in the municipal unit of Olenia, Achaea, Greece. It is located on the southern end of Mount Skollis, 5 km south of Santomeri,  23 km south of Kato Achaia and 37 km southwest of Patras. Its population in 2011 was 256.

Population

References

External links
 Portes GTP Travel Pages

See also

List of settlements in Achaea

Olenia
Populated places in Achaea